9969 Braille, provisional designation , is an eccentric, rare-type and elongated asteroid from the innermost regions of the asteroid belt, classified as Mars-crosser and slow rotator, approximately 1–2 kilometers in diameter. It was discovered in 1992, by astronomers at Palomar Observatory and later named after Louis Braille, the inventor of the writing system for the blind. It was photographed in closeup by the spacecraft Deep Space 1 in 1999, but a malfunction resulted in indistinct images.

Discovery and naming 

Discovered on May 27, 1992, by E. F. Helin and K. J. Lawrence working at the Palomar observatory as part of NASA's Planet-Crossing Asteroid Survey, it was given the provisional designation . Later, it was named Braille in honour of Louis Braille as suggested by Kennedy Space Center software engineer Kerry Babcock in The Planetary Society's contest titled "Name That Asteroid". The official naming citation was published by the Minor Planet Center on 28 July 1999.

Orbit 

Braille has an unusually inclined orbit, and belongs to the somewhat rare class of asteroids known as Mars-crossing asteroids. Simulations of its orbit by scientists of the Deep Space 1 project predict that it will evolve into an Earth-crossing orbit in about 4000 years. Although its closest approach to the Sun is closer than Mars orbit, its highly elliptical orbit takes it almost half-way to Jupiter at its apoapsis, and as such its semi-major axis is too large for it to be classified as an Amor asteroid.

Physical characteristics 

Braille is a Q-type asteroid, composed mostly of olivine and pyroxene. Early ground-based observations had suggested that it could have been a V-type asteroid with similarities of composition between it and the much larger 4 Vesta. The asteroid is irregularly shaped, measuring approximately 2.1 km × 1 km × 1 km.

Exploration 

Detailed information about Braille comes primarily from the Deep Space 1 probe, which passed within 26 km of the asteroid on July 29, 1999, and from extensive ground based observations done in conjunction with the mission. By the time Deep Space 1 reached Braille, its ultraviolet spectrometer had failed, but it did return two CCD images of medium resolution and three infrared spectra during the encounter. However, although the probe came within 26 km of Braille, the images and spectra were taken from an approximate distance of 14 000 km, due to problems with the tracking system.

The main purpose of the Deep Space 1 mission was technology testing, but the encounter with Braille was of strong scientific value. No lone asteroid as small as Braille had previously been observed from such a short distance.

References

External links

 Asteroid Lightcurve Database (LCDB), query form (info )
 Dictionary of Minor Planet Names, Google books
 Asteroids and comets rotation curves, CdR – Observatoire de Genève, Raoul Behrend
 Discovery Circumstances: Numbered Minor Planets (5001)-(10000) – Minor Planet Center
 
 

009969
Discoveries by Kenneth J. Lawrence
Discoveries by Eleanor F. Helin
Named minor planets
19990729
009969
009969
19920527